Time-lapse monitoring may refer to:

Time-lapse microscopy
Time-lapse cytometry